Bolivia at the 1964 Summer Olympics in Tokyo, Japan was the second appearance of the nation at the fourteenth edition of the Olympic Summer Games following a hiatus after the 1936 Summer Olympics in Berlin, Germany. Bolivia sent to the 1964 Summer Olympics its second national team of one male athlete, Fernando Inchauste, under the auspices of the Bolivian Olympic Committee ( - COB). Inchauste was the flag bearer, and he was a canoeist who competed in the Men's K-1 1000 metres, where he qualified for the semifinal but did not start.

Canoeing 

Fernando Inchauste - Men's K-1 1000 metres

 Heat 2 - 6th (5:48:74)
 Repechange - 6:07:70 (Qualified)
 Semifinal - Did not Start

References
Official Olympic Reports
sports-reference

Nations at the 1964 Summer Olympics
1964
Olympics